France Winddance Twine is a Black and Native American sociologist, ethnographer, visual artist, and documentary filmmaker. Twine's research has made significant contributions to interdisciplinary research in gender and sexuality studies, racism/anti-racism, feminist studies, science and technology studies, British cultural studies, and qualitative research methods. She has conducted field research in Brazil, the UK, and the United States on race, racism, and anti-racism and has published 11 books and more than 80 articles, review essays, and books on these topics. In 2020, she was awarded the Distinguished Career Award by the Race, Class, and Gender section of the American Sociological Association for her intellectual, innovative, and creative contributions to sociology. Twine is the first sociologist to publish an ethnography on everyday racism in rural Brazil after the end of military dictatorship during the "abertura" (return to democratic rule).

Early life
A native of Chicago, she is the granddaughter of Paul Twine, Sr., a Civil Rights activist and founding member of the Catholic Interracial Council of Chicago, a Civil Rights organization that brought Irish, Italian, German, Polish and Black Catholics together to fight for racial justice.

Education
Twine is a graduate of Northwestern University and earned her M.A. and Ph.D. at the University of California, Berkeley. She was a research fellow in the class of 2008–2009 at the Center for Advanced Study in the Behavioral Sciences at Stanford University. In 2007, she was a distinguished visiting professor in the sociology department at the London School of Economics. She has taught and held tenured professorships at Duke University and the University of Washington in Seattle. Twine is an enrolled member of the Muscogee (Creek) Nation of Oklahoma.

She is the former deputy editor of American Sociological Review, the flagship journal of the American Sociological Association. Twine currently serves as a member of the International editorial boards of Sociology, the official journal of the British Sociological Association, and the journals Social Problems and Identities: Global Studies in Culture and Power. She has also served on the editorial board of Ethnic and Racial Studies, the highest impact peer-reviewed journal devoted to the study of racial and ethnic inequalities in the discipline of Sociology.

Twine's research examines the intersections of racial, gender and class inequalities on both sides of the Atlantic. Her recent publications include Outsourcing the Womb: Race, Class and Gestational Surrogacy in a Global Market  (2015), Geographies of Privilege (2013) and Girls With Guns: Firearms, Feminism and Militarism (2012). She is the editor for the Routledge series, Framing 21st Century Social Issues.

Career
Twine is an ethnographer and feminist race theorist who has over 90 publications including 10 books. She has conducted field research in Brazil, Britain and the United States. Her research has been supported by the Rockefeller Foundation and the Andrew Mellon Foundation. Her recent books include Outsourcing the Womb (Routledge, 2015), Geographies of Privilege Edited by France Winddance Twine, Bradley Gardener (Routledge, 2013), Girls with Guns: Firearms, Feminism and Militarism (Routledge, 2012), A White Side of Black Britain: Interracial Intimacy and Racial Literacy (Duke University Press, 2010) and Racism in a Racial Democracy: the maintenance of white supremacy in Brazil (Rutgers University Press, 1997) and an editor of five volumes including Retheorizing Race and Whiteness in the 21st Century: Changes and Challenges (Routledge, 2011)  and Feminism and Anti-Racism: international struggles for  justice (New York University Press, 2000).

Her articles, film reviews and book reviews have appeared in English and Brazilian Portuguese in international journals: the Du Bois Review: Social Science Research on Race, Ethnic and Racial Studies, Estudos Afroasiaticos, Feminist Studies, Meridians: feminism, race, and transnationalism, Signs: Journal of Women in Culture and Society, Social Identities, Race and Class, and Gender and Society.  Twine's current research focuses on inequality in Silicon Valley and transnational gestational surrogacy. One of her most important theoretical contributions is the concept of racial literacy which was first published in a 2004 journal article and developed in her book A White Side of Black Britain.

Twine was a scholar in residence at the Beatrice Bain Research Group (2014–2015).

Academic positions and honors
2020 Distinguished Career Award from the American Sociological Association
2019 Doctorate in Humane Letters honoris causa from Colorado College
2014-2015 Scholar in Residence at the Beatrice Bain Research Group at the University of California, Berkeley
2008-2009 Fellow at the Center for Advanced Study in the Behavioral Sciences at Stanford University
2007 Visiting Professor, The Gender Institute and department of sociology, the London School of Economics and Political Science
2002–present Professor of Sociology, University of California, Santa Barbara
2003-05 Professor of Sociology, Duke University (on leave from University of California, Santa Barbara )
2001 Rockefeller Foundation Bellagio Center Fellowship	
1997-2002  Assistant to Full Professor of Sociology, University of California, Santa Barbara	
1998-2000 Associate Professor of International Studies & Women Studies, Henry M. Jackson School of International Studies, University of Washington at Seattle
1997-1998 Assistant Professor of Sociology, University of California, Santa Barbara
1994-97 Assistant Professor of Women Studies, University of Washington at Seattle

Selected publications

Books
Geek Girls: Inequality and Opportunity in Silicon Valley. (2022) NYU Press. 
Outsourcing the Womb: Race, Class and Gestational Surrogacy in a Global Market. Second edition, (2015) Routledge. 
Geographies of Privilege, (2013) Edited by France Winddance Twine, Bradley Gardener Routledge. 
Girls with Guns: Firearms, Feminism and Militarism, (2012) Routledge. 
Retheorizing Race and Whiteness in the 21st Century: Changes and Challenges (2011) Routledge, co-edited with Charles A. Gallagher 
Outsourcing the Womb: Race, Class and Gestational Surrogacy in a Global Market, (2011) Routledge. 
 A White Side of Black Britain: Interracial Intimacy and Racial Literacy, (2010) Duke University Press. 
Feminism and Anti-Racism: International Struggles for Justice, (2001), New York University Press, co-edited with Kathleen Blee. 
Ideologies and Technologies of Motherhood: Race, Class, Sexuality and Nationalism, (2000), Routledge, co-edited with Helena Ragone. 
Racing Research/Researching Race: Methodological Dilemmas in Critical Race Studies, (2000), New York University Press, co-edited with Jonathan Warren. 
Feminisms and Youth Cultures, a special issue of Signs: Journal of Women in Culture and Society, Vol. 23, no. 3, (Spring, 1998), University of Chicago Press, co-edited with Kum Kum Bhavani and Kathryn Kent.
Racism in a Racial Democracy: The Maintenance of White Supremacy in Brazil, (1997) Rutgers University Press.

Journal articles
 Technology's Invisible Women: Black Geek Girls in Silicon Valley and the Failure of Diversity Initiatives International Journal of Critical Diversity Studies, Vol. 1 No. 1 (2018): 58–79.
 Gender-Fluid Geek Girls: Negotiating Inequality Regimes in the Tech Industry, Gender & Society, Vol. 31, Issue 1: 28-50 (2017)
White migrations: Swedish women, gender vulnerabilities and racial privileges, in European Journal of Women's Studies vol.18, no.1 (2011): 67–86. Coauthored with Catrin Lundstrom.
The Gap Between Whites and Whiteness: Interracial Intimacy and Racial literacy, in Du Bois Review, vol.3, no.2 (2006): 341–363. Coauthored with Amy Steinbugler.
Visual Ethnography and Racial Theory: family photographs as archives of Interracial Intimacies, in Ethnic and Racial Studies (a special issue on ethnography) vol. 29, no. 3 (May, 2006): 487–511.
A White Side of Black Britain: The Concept of Racial Literacy, in Ethnic and Racial Studies, (a special issue on racial hierarchy) vol. 27, no. 6 (November 2004): 1-30.
White Americans, the New Minority?: Non-Blacks and the Ever-Expanding Boundaries of Whiteness, Journal of Black Studies, vol. 28, no. 2: 200–218. Co-authored with Jonathan Warren
Brown Skinned White Girls: Class, Culture and the Construction of White Identity in Suburban Communities, in Gender, Place and Culture: A Journal of Feminist Geography, vol. 3, no. 2 (July 1996): 204–224.
O hiato de genero nas percepcoes de racismo: o caso dos afro-brasileiros socialments ascendentes, in Estudos Afro-Asiaticos, vol. 29 (March 1996) 37–54.

Film productions
Just Black?: Multiracial Identity in the U.S., (1990), with J. Warren and F. Ferrandiz, New York, Filmakers Library

References

External links
Twine's page at UCSB 
Interracial Interview with Twine on marriage and strong black women
Twine's Page at the open access Academia.edu
Twine's presentation in Amsterdam in honor of the 1967 U.S. Supreme Court decision Loving v. Virginia on interracial marriage
 The panel and audience portion of the June 12, 2014, Loving Day presentation in Amsterdam
 Link to film, Just Black? at IMDB
Colorado College 2019 commencement video
2020 Lecture: The Afterlife of Eugenics: Incarcerated Women and the Fertility Continuum

1960 births
Living people
Scientists from Chicago
Academics of the London School of Economics
Black studies scholars
American feminists
American sociologists
Duke University faculty
Ethnographers
Feminist studies scholars
Muscogee (Creek) Nation people
Native American academics
Native American women academics
American women academics
Northwestern University alumni
University of California, Berkeley alumni
University of California, Santa Barbara faculty
American women sociologists
American women social scientists
African-American social scientists
American women film directors
American film directors
African-American film producers
American film producers
African-American writers
American writers
African-American educators
Writers from Chicago
Writers from California
Center for Advanced Study in the Behavioral Sciences fellows
American women film producers
American women anthropologists
Native American women scientists
Black Native American people